Ewonde a Kwane was a Duala ruler of the Bonambela/Akwa lineage who lived in Douala on the Wouri River (modern Cameroon). Ewonde was the son of the powerful chief Kwane a Ngie (known in British records as Angua or Quan). Ewonde died early, causing a secession crisis in Bonambela. Ngando a Kwa claimed to be his heir and declared himself equal to Bele a Doo, leader of the Bonanjo/Bell lineage. Ewonde's daughter Kanya married Enjobe, an Aboh slave or immigrant in Douala. Their son would found the Bonambele/Deido sublineage. Duala tradition states that another of Ewonde's daughters, Lesenge, married into Isubu royalty and was the mother of King William of Bimbia.

References

Cameroonian traditional rulers
Year of birth missing
Year of death missing